Mercedes-Benz has produced a range of petrol, diesel, and natural gas engines. This is a list of all internal combustion engine models manufactured.

Petrol engines

Straight-three 
 M160, 0.6 – 0.7 L (1998–2007)
 M281, 0.9 - 1.0 L (2014–present)

Flat-four 
 M144, 1.3 L (1936–1937, prototype)

Inline-four 
 M23, 1.3 L (1933–1936)
 M30, 1.5 L (1934–1939)
 M136, 1.7 – 1.8 L (1935–1955)
 M149, 2.0 L (1938–1939)
 M121, 1.9 – 2.0 L (1955–1968)
 M118, 1.5 – 1.8 L (1965–1972)
 M115, 2.0 – 2.3 L (1968–1985)
 M102, 1.8 – 2.5 L (1980–1996)
 M111, 1.8 – 2.3 L (1992–2006)
 M166, 1.4 – 2.1 L (1997–2005)
 М135 1.3 – 1.6 L (2004–2010)
 M271, 1.6 – 1.8 L (2002–2015)
 M266, 1.5 – 2.0 L (2004–2012)
 M270, 1.6 – 2.0 L (2011–present)
 M200, 1.2 L (2012–present)
 M274, 1.6 – 2.0 L (2012–present)
 M133, 2.0 L (2013–2019)
 M139, 2.0 L (2019–present)
 M260/M264, 1.5 – 2.0 L (2017–present) 
 M282, 1.3 L (2018–present)
 M254, 2.0 L (2021–present)

Flat-six 
 M145, 1.9 L (1936–1937, prototype)

Straight-six 
 M836, 3.9 – 4.0 L (1924–1929)
 M9456, 6.3 L (1924–1929)
 M01, 1.4 L (1926, prototype)
 M02, 2.0 L (1926–1933)
 M03, 3.0 L (1926–1927)
 M04, 3.0 – 3.1 L (1927–1928)
 M09, 3.4 L (1928–1929)
 M06, 6.8 – 7.1 L (1928–1934)
 M10, 3.5 L (1929–1933)
 M11, 2.6 L (1929–1935)
 M15, 1.7 L (1931–1936)
 M18, 2.9 L (1933–1937)
 M21, 2.0 L (1933–1936)
 M143, 2.2 L (1936–1941)
 M142, 3.2 L (1937–1942)
 M153, 2.3 L (1939–1943)
 M159, 2.6 L (1940, prototype)
 M180, 2.2 – 2.3 L (1951–1980)
 M186, 3.0 L (1951–1958)
 M188, 3.0 L (1952–1958)
 M194, 3.0 L (1952)
 M198, 3.0 L (1954–1963)
 M199, 3.0 L (1955–1958)
 M127, 2.2 L (1958–1964)
 M189, 3.0 L (1958–1967)
 M129, 2.5 L (1965–1967)
 M108, 2.5 L (1965–1967)
 M130, 2.8 L (1968–1972)
 M114, 2.5 L (1967–1972)
 M123, 2.5 L (1976–1985)
 M110, 2.8 L (1972–1986)
 M103, 2.6 – 3.0 L (1984–1995)
 M104, 2.8 – 3.6 L (1989–1997)
 M256, 3.0 L (2017–present)

V6 
 M106, 2.5 L (1994–1996; non-production - prototype DTM racing engine)
 M112, 2.4 – 3.7 L (1997–2005)
 M272, 2.5 – 3.5 L (2004–2017)
 M276, 2.8 – 3.5 L (2010–present)
 Mercedes-Benz turbo-hybrid V6 F1 engine 1.6 L (2014–present)

Flat-eight 
 M146, 2.5 L (1936-1937, prototype)

Straight-eight 
 M08, 4.6 – 5.0 L (1928–1940)
 M07, 7.7 L (1930–1938)
 M19, 3.8 L (1932–1933)
 M22, 3.8 – 4.0 L (1933–1934)
 M24, 5.0 – 5.4 L (1934–1944)
 M150, 7.7 L (1938–1944)
 M124, 5.8 L (1939, prototype)
 M25 / M125 3.4 - 5.7 L (1934–1939)
 M196 2.5 – 3.0 L (1954–1955)

V8 
 M147, 4.0 L (1938, prototype)
 M100, 6.3 – 6.9 L (1963–1981)
 M116, 3.5 – 4.2 L (1969–1991)
 M117, 4.5 – 5.6 L (1971–1992)
 M119, 4.2 – 6.0 L (1989–1999)
 500I, 3.43 L (1994; non-production – Indy car racing engine)
 IC108, 2.65 – 3.43 L (1995–2000; non-production – Indy car racing engine)
 M113, 4.3 – 5.5 L (1997–2012)
 M155, 5.4 L (2004–2009)
 M273, 4.7 – 5.5 L (2005–2010)
 FO, 2.4 L (2006–2013; non-production – Formula One racing engine)
 M156, 6.2 L (2006–2014)
 M159, 6.2 L (2009–2014)
 M278, 4.7 L (2010–2020)
 M157, 5.5 L (2010–2019)
 M152, 5.5 L (2012–2015)
 M176/M177/M178, 4.0 L (2014–present)

V10 
 FO, 3.0 – 3.5 L (1994–2005; non-production – racing engine)

V12 
 M154 / M163 3.0 – 4.7 L (1934–1939; non-production – Grand Prix racing engine)
 M148, 6.0 L (1941–1942, prototype)
 M157, 6.0 L (1941–1942, prototype)
 MB503 42.4 - 44.5 L (1937-1939, prototype)
 MB509, 44.0 L (used in Panzer VIII Maus V1)
 M120, 6.0 – 7.3 L (1991–1998)
 M297, 6.9 – 7.3 L (1997–2016)
 M137, 5.8 – 6.3 L (1998–2002)
 M285, 5.5 L (2003–2012)
 M275, 6.0 L (2004–2015)
 M279, 6.0 L (2012–present)
 M158, 6.0 L (2012–present)
 M277, 6.0 L (2014–2020)

Flat-12 
M291, 3.5 L (1991–1992; non-production – Group C racing engine)

Wankel 
 M950F,  1.8 – 2.4 L (1969–1970)

Inline diesel engines

One-cylinder 
 MB851, 1.5 L
 MB861, 1.5 L

Inline-Two 
 MB852, 2.9 L
 MB862, 2.9 L
 OM632, 0.8 L
 M202B, 6.5 L (1947–???)

Inline-three 
 MB853, 4.3 L
 M203B, 9.7 L (1947–???)
 MB863, 4.3 L (1954–???)
 OM660, 0.8 L (1998–2015)
 OM639, 1.5 L (2004–2009)

Inline-four 
 OM138, 2.5 L (1935–1940)
 OM636, 1.7 – 1.8 L (1949–1990)
 OM621, 1.9 – 2.0 L (1959–1967)
 OM615, 2.0 – 2.2 L (1968–1985)
 OM616, 2.4 L (1973–1985)
 OM601, 2.0 – 2.3 L (1983–2001)
 OM604, 2.0 – 2.2 L (1993–1998)
 OM668, 1.7 L (1997–2005)
 OM611, 2.1 – 2.2 L (1998–2006)
 OM646, 2.1 L (2002–2010)
 OM640, 2.0 L (2004–2012)
 OM651, 1.8 – 2.1 L (2008–present)
 OM622/OM626, 1.6 L (2014–2018)
 OM654, 2.0 L (2016–present)
OM664 (Ssangyong D20DT engine), 2.0 L (2005–2012)
 OM699, 2.3 L (2017–2020)
 OM607, 1.5 L (2012–present)
 OM608, 1.5 L (2018–present)

Buses and trucks:

 OM314, 3.8 L (1965–???)
 OM364, 4.0 L (1984–???)
 OM904, 4.2 L (1996–present)
 OM924, 4.8 L (2004–present)
 OM934, 5.1 L (2013–present)

Inline-five 
 OM617, 3.0 L (1974–1991)
 OM602, 2.5 – 2.9 L (1985–2002)
 OM605, 2.5 L (1993–2001)
 OM612, 2.7 L (1999–2006)
OM665, 2.7 L (2001–2014) (Licensed version of OM612 engine for (WJ) Jeep Grand Cherokee (OM665.921 2.7 CRD engine) and for some models of SsangYong (D27DT/OM665.9xx 2.7 XDI engine))
 OM647, 2.7 L (2004–2006)

Inline-six 
OM603, 3.0 – 3.5 L (1986–1997)
OM606, 3.0 L (1993–2001)
OM613, 3.2 L (1999–2003)
OM648, 3.2 L (2002–2006)
OM656, 2.9 L (2017–present)

Buses and trucks:
 OM5, 8.6 L (1928–1932)
 OM49
 OM54, 12.5 L (1934–1939)
 OM57, 11.3 – 12.5 L (1938–1940)
 OM65
 OM67, 7.2 – 7.4 L (1935–1954)
 OM77
 OM79, 10.3 L (1932–1936)
 OM302, 4.6 L (1941) (prototype)
 OM312, 4.6 L (1949)
 OM315, 8.2 L
 OM321, 5.1 L
 OM322, 5.7 L
 OM326, 10.8 L
 OM346, 10.8 L
 OM352, 5.7 L (1963–???)
 OM355, 11.6 L
 OM360, 8.7 L
 OM366, 6.0 L (1984–present)
 OM407 11.4 L
 OM427 12.0 L
 OM447 12.0 L
 OM457, 12.0 L (2003–present)
 OM460 12.8 L
 OM470, 10.7 L
 OM471, 12.8 L
 OM472, 14.8 L
 OM473, 15.6 L (2012–present)
 OM906, 6.4 L (1998–present)
 OM926, 7.2 L (2000–present)
 OM936, 7.6 L (2013–present)

V-diesel engines

V6 
 OM642, 3.0 L (2005–present)

Buses and trucks:
 OM401, 9.6L
 OM421, 11.0 L (1982–1995)
 OM441 (1978–present) (used in Hyundai KR111/RM114)
 OM501, 12.0 L

V8 
 OM628, 4.0 L (1999–2005)
 OM629, 4.0 L (2005–2010)

Busses and trucks:
 OM402 12.8 L
 OM422 14.6 L
 OM442 14.6 L - 15.1 L
 OM502 16.0 L

V10 
 OM403 16.0 L
 OM423 18.3 L
 OM443 18.3 L - 18.8 L
 OM503

V12 
 OM404, 20.9 L
 OM424 22.0 L
 OM444, 22.6 L
 OM504
 MB500, 66.4 L (used in e-boats)
 MB507, 42.4 – 44.5 L
 MB512
 MB517, 42.4 L (used in Panzer VIII Maus V2)
 MB820
 MB835

V16 
 MB602
 MB512
 MB839, 104.3 L

V20 
 MB501
 MB511 
 MB518, 134.4 L (1951–1973)

Natural gas engines 
 M366 (CNG), 6.0 L
 M407 (LPG)
 M447 (CNG), 12.0 L
 M906 (CNG), 6.9 L
 M936G (CNG), 7.7 L
OM924, 4.8 L
OM926 (CNG), 7.2 L

References

 
Engines
Mercedes-Benz